Jake Johannsen (born July 28, 1960) is an American comedian, writer, and actor.

Early life
Johannsen attended Iowa State University in the early 1980s, originally majoring in veterinary medicine, and then later changing to chemical engineering. He left after three years in college and relocated to San Francisco, California, in order to pursue a career in comedy. Johannsen made his debut at Cobb's Comedy Club in San Francisco, and by 1986 had won the 11th Annual San Francisco International Comedy Competition.

Career
During the 1990s, Johannsen starred in his own HBO comedy special, This'll Take About an Hour, which was listed as one of the Ten Best Television Shows by People Magazine in 1992. In 1994, he was nominated as "Best Male Stand-Up Comedian" for the 1994 American Comedy Awards.

According to Jerry Seinfeld, Johannsen was originally wanted for the role of George Costanza in Seinfeld, but he refused the part.

In 2010, Johannsen starred in his second Comedy Special titled I Love You, which aired on Showtime and was directed and produced by The Aristocrats editor Emery Emery.

Johannsen also was the star headliner of the inaugural Iowa Comedy Festival. Johannsen performed October 16, 2010, at People's Court in downtown Des Moines to cap off the four-day event.

Johannsen is a favorite of David Letterman and made the all time record of 46 appearances as the featured Friday night comic on the Late Show with David Letterman.

Filmography

Film

Television

Personal life
He and his wife, actress Belinda Waymouth, have one child.

References

External links
 Official website
 

1960 births
Living people
American stand-up comedians
People from Iowa City, Iowa
20th-century American comedians
21st-century American comedians